Pankhiraj (English:Lord of Birds) is a 1979 Bengali language Indian drama film directed by Pijush Basu, starring Uttam Kumar, Soumitra Chatterjee, Nandita Bose, Samit Bhanja, and Utpal Dutta.

Cast 

 Uttam Kumar
 Soumitra Chatterjee
 Nandita Bose
 Samit Bhanja
 Santu Mukherjee
 Utpal Dutta

References

External links 

 

1979 films
Bengali-language Indian films
1970s Bengali-language films